KHAR (590 AM) is a commercial sports radio station in Anchorage, Alaska, United States. It features programming from the CBS Sports Radio network.  Owned by Alpha Media, its studios are located in Anchorage (two blocks west of Dimond Center), and its transmitter is in the Bayshore neighborhood in South Anchorage.

History
KHAR went on the air in 1961. The station was founded by Willis "Bill" Harpel, who previously worked at KFQD and owned stations in Washington state. He founded Sourdough Broadcasters, and would launch KHAR-FM (now KBRJ) and KHAR-TV (now KYUR) prior to his accidental death in January 1968.  His family, particularly widow Patricia and son Craig, would continue to run Sourdough Broadcasters for many more decades.

During its earlier decades, KHAR, like many AM stations, aired a general format, including music and news. Notable aspects of early programming included broadcasting messages to Bush residents, a practice once fairly common among urban broadcasters in Alaska, but found on very few stations today. The station was also noted for carrying the commentaries of Ruben Gaines, a onetime poet laureate of Alaska known for creating the character "Chilkoot Charlie".

KHAR programmed an adult standards format, or minor variations thereof, from at least the 1970s until 2013.  The station's branding, Heart Radio 59, was also featured for decades. KHAR was one of very few commercial stations in Alaska whose format more or less remained intact during the era of broadcasting company consolidation which began in the 1990s.

Resultant from that consolidation, KHAR was one of a number of Anchorage stations acquired by Morris Communications. It shared studios with its sister stations in the Morris Alaska building near the Dimond Center. On May 1, 2013, KHAR changed its format from adult standards to sports, with programming from CBS Sports Radio.

Morris Communications sold KHAR and 32 other stations to Alpha Media LLC effective September 1, 2015, at a purchase price of $38.25 million.

Translator
KHAR is also broadcast on the following FM translator:

See also

 List of radio stations in Alaska

References

External links
FCC History Cards for KHAR

1961 establishments in Alaska
Radio stations established in 1961
HAR
Sports radio stations in the United States
Alpha Media radio stations